Robert Leach may refer to:

 Bob Leach (1914–2008), American journalist and screenwriter
 Robert E. Leach (1911–1993), Republican judge in the U.S. State of Ohio
 Robert M. Leach (1879–1952), U.S. Representative from Massachusetts
 Robert Leach (cricketer) (1849–1939), English cricketer